Andrey Andreyevich Piontkovsky (born June 30, 1940, Moscow) is a Russian scientist and political writer and analyst, a member of International PEN Club. He is a former member of the Russian Opposition Coordination Council.

Biography
He graduated from the Mathematics Department of Moscow State University and has published more than a hundred scientific papers on applied mathematics.

He was an executive director of the Strategic Studies Center (Moscow) think tank that has been closed since 2006. He contributes regularly to Novaya Gazeta, The Moscow Times, The Russia Journal and the online journals Grani.ru and Transitions Online. He is also a regular political commentator for the BBC World Service and Radio Liberty in Moscow. He has been an outspoken critic of Putin's "managed" democracy in Russia and, as such, has described Russia as a "soft totalitarian regime" and "hybrid fascism."

Piontkovsky is a member of the American Mathematical Society.

Piontkovsky is the author of several books on the Putin presidency in Russia, including his most recent book, Another Look Into Putin's Soul.

Piontkovsky is one of the 34 first signatories of the online anti-Putin manifesto "Putin Must Go", published on 10 March 2010. In his subsequent articles he has repeatedly stressed its importance and urged citizens to sign it.

On 26 June 2013, Piontkovsky commented the case of Edward Snowden by saying, "If Pushkov dares to draw a parallel between Snowden and Soviet dissidents, I must respond that none of them had anything to do with Soviet special services and none of them pledged not to betray state and departmental secrets."

Piontkovsky compared the Crimean speech of Vladimir Putin in 2014 to Hitler's speech on Sudetenland in 1939. He described Putin as using "the same arguments and vision of history" and beyond that, that this speech played a key role in starting the war in Donbas.

In 2016 he published an article "Бомба, готовая взорваться" ("A bomb that is ready to explode") about Russian-Chechen ethnic conflict. When the General Prosecutor Office found his article "extremist" and started criminal prosecution  Piontkovsky at last left Russia on 19 February 2016.

Condemnation of fascism
Piontkovsky adduces Igor Girkin's name among those of like-minded persons and says, "The authentic high-principled Hitlerites, true Aryans Dugin, Prokhanov, Girkin, Prilepin are a marginalized minority in Russia." Piontkovsky adds, "Putin has stolen the ideology of the Russian Reich from the domestic Hitlerites, he has preventively burned them down, using their help to do so, hundreds of their most active supporters in the furnace of the Ukrainian Vendée." In his interview with Radio Liberty, Piontkovsky says that maybe the meaning of the operation conducted by Putin is to reveal all these potential passionate leaders of social revolt, send them to Ukraine and burn them in the furnace of the Ukrainian Vendée. In the interviews Andrey also argues that the ideology of Rashism is in many ways similar to German fascism (Nazism), while in speeches and policies of the President Putin it's similar to the ideas of Hitler.

Some works 
In English
 
 
 
 
 
 
 
 
 
 
 
 
 
 

In Russian
 
 
 
 
 
 
 
 
 
 
 
 
 His articles in The Jamestown Foundation
 His articles in Project Syndicate
 The Law of the Nerd, English translation from grani.ru
 His articles in grani.ru (Russian)
 Putin's Russia as a Revisionist Power

Video

References

1940 births
21st-century Russian male writers
21st-century Russian politicians
Living people
Writers from Moscow
2011–2013 Russian protests
Hudson Institute
Moscow State University alumni
Russian activists against the 2022 Russian invasion of Ukraine
Solidarnost politicians
Yabloko politicians
Russian dissidents
Russian male journalists
Russian mathematicians
Russian political activists
Russian political writers
Soviet mathematicians